Bioenergy Europe (formerly known as AEBIOM) is a European trade association open to national biomass associations and bioenergy companies active in Europe. It was founded in 1990 under the leadership of French senator Michel Souplet with the aim to promote energy generation from biomass in all its forms: biopower, bioheat, or biofuels for transport.
Bioenergy Europe is the umbrella organisation of the European Pellet Council (EPC), and the International Biomass Torrefaction Council (IBTC).

Bioenergy Europe owns two international certifications for wood fuels. ENplus, certifying wood pellets quality and GoodChips, aiming at guaranteeing wood chips and hog fuel quality.

Governance 
As a European trade federation, Bioenergy Europe governance is ensured by its members (see list below) and structured around a General Assembly, a board of directors and a Core Groups that decide on the strategic orientations and political lines of the organisation based on the advises of Bioenergy Europe's Working Groups and Secretariat.

See also 
Czech Biomass Association

References

External links
Bioenergy Europe website
 EPC website
 IBTC website
 ENplus website

Bioenergy organizations
Renewable energy
Natural resources organizations
Environmental organizations based in Europe
Sustainable business
Soil improvers
Biomass
Wood fuel
Wood products
Business organizations based in Europe